Saint-Jean-aux-Amognes is a commune in the Nièvre department in central France.

See also
Communes of the Nièvre department

References

External links

Official website 

Communes of Nièvre